"Andale" is a song by French rapper Sadek featuring Gradur, released on November 23, 2018, as him, Nique le casino mixtape single.

Writing and composition
"Andale" is a trap-pop song with hip-hop influences written in the key of B♭m major with a moderate tempo of 102 beats per minute.

Music video
As of December 2022, the music video for Andale had over 53 million views on YouTube.

Charts

Certifications

References

2016 songs
2016 singles
French trap songs
French pop songs